The Collège Communautaire du Nouveau-Brunswick Campus of the Acadian Peninsula is an institution of higher education (CCNB) located in Shippagan, New Brunswick.

The college is located on avenue de l'Église, near the port of Shippagan and the University of Moncton. It was founded on April 1, 2000.

External links 
 Acadian Peninsula Campus

Collège communautaire du Nouveau-Brunswick
Education in Gloucester County, New Brunswick